Patrick Calum MacArthur (born 27 April 1987) is a former Scotland international rugby union player. He formerly played as a hooker for Glasgow Warriors in the Pro14. He is now a player-coach at Ayr.

Rugby Union career

Amateur career
He has played for West of Scotland

MacArthur has turned out for Ayr. He was assigned Ayr in the Pro draft for the Scottish Premiership sides from Glasgow Warriors for the season 2017-18.

Professional career
MacArthur has made more than 100 appearances for Glasgow Warriors.

International career
MacArthur represented his country at under-18, 19 and 20 level. He played for Scotland A in 2012, before making his full international debut with Scotland in 2013.

Coaching career

MacArthur is the Assistant Coach at Ayr. It was announced that he would keep playing for one more year in a player-coach capacity at the club.

References

External links
 Pat MacArthur Scottish Rugby Player Profile
 Pat MacArthur ESPN Scrum Player Profile

1987 births
Living people
Ayr RFC players
Glasgow Warriors players
Rugby union hookers
Rugby union players from Irvine, North Ayrshire
Scotland 'A' international rugby union players
Scotland Club XV international rugby union players
Scotland international rugby union players
Scottish rugby union coaches
Scottish rugby union players
West of Scotland FC players